Eloy de Menezes (born 24 November 1910, date of death unknown) was a Brazilian equestrian. He competed at the 1948 Summer Olympics, the 1952 Summer Olympics and the 1956 Summer Olympics.

References

1910 births
Year of death missing
Brazilian male equestrians
Olympic equestrians of Brazil
Equestrians at the 1948 Summer Olympics
Equestrians at the 1952 Summer Olympics
Equestrians at the 1956 Summer Olympics
Place of birth missing